KT Lupi is a visual binary star system in the constellation Lupus. It is visible to the naked eye with a combined apparent visual magnitude of 4.55. The system is moving further from the Earth with a heliocentric radial velocity of +6.5 km/s. It is a member of the Lower Centaurus–Crux sub-group of the Scorpius–Centaurus association.

The primary, component A, is a variable Be star, with the variation being modulated by rotation. It is visual magnitude 4.66 with a stellar classification of B3 V, matching a B-type main-sequence star. Hiltner et al. (1969) gave a class of B3 IVp, which is still used in some studies. It is a helium-weak chemically peculiar star showing an enhanced silicon patch near the equator and a silicon-weak region close to the pole. The star is about 21 million years old with nearly six times the mass of the Sun and three times the Sun's radius.

The secondary companion, component B, is of magnitude 6.62 with a class of B6 V. It has 2.79 times the Sun's mass.

References

B-type main-sequence stars
B-type subgiants
Be stars
Helium-weak stars
Binary stars
Lupus (constellation)
Lupi, d
Durchmusterung objects
138769
076371
5781
Lupi, KT
Lower Centaurus Crux